Agdistis qurayyahiensis is a moth in the family Pterophoridae. It is known from the United Arab Emirates.

References

Agdistinae
Moths described in 2008